The 1920 Atlantic hurricane season featured tropical storms and hurricanes only in the month of September. Although no "hurricane season" was defined at the time, the present-day delineation of such is June 1 to November 30. The first system, a hurricane, developed on September 7 while the last, a tropical depression, transitioned into an extratropical cyclone on October 27. Of note, four of the six cyclones co-existed with another tropical cyclone during the season.

Of the season's six tropical cyclones, five became tropical storms and four strengthened into hurricanes. Furthermore, none of these strengthened into a major hurricane—Category 3 or higher on the modern-day Saffir–Simpson hurricane wind scale—marking the seventh such occurrence since 1900. The strongest hurricane of the season peaked as only as a strong Category 2 with winds of 110 mph (175  km/h). The second hurricane caused one death and $1.45 million (1920 USD) in damage in Louisiana, the third left one fatality in North Carolina, and the fifth storm indirectly killed one person in Florida.

The season's activity was reflected with an accumulated cyclone energy (ACE) rating of 30, below the 1911–1920 average of 58.7. ACE is, broadly speaking, a measure of the power of the hurricane multiplied by the length of time it existed, so storms that last a long time, as well as particularly strong hurricanes, have high ACEs. It is only calculated for full advisories on tropical systems at or exceeding 39 mph (63 km/h), which is the threshold for tropical storm status.


Timeline

Systems

Hurricane One 

The first known storm of the season was initially identified on September 7 as a 40 mph (65 km/h) tropical storm over Atlantic Ocean. Traveling towards the northwest, the storm gradually intensified, attaining hurricane-status late on September 9. The following day, a ship in the vicinity of the storm recorded a pressure of 985 mbar (hPa), the lowest pressure recorded in relation to the storm. Around 1200 UTC, the hurricane turned towards the north and intensified into a modern-day Category 2 hurricane on the Saffir–Simpson scale early on September 11. The storm continued to intensify through September 12 when it reached its peak intensity with winds of 110 mph (175 km/h). After maintaining this intensity for 18 hours, the hurricane began to weaken as it turned towards the northwest. By 0000 UTC on September 14, the storm weakened to a Category 1 hurricane. The system began to undergo an extratropical transition, completing the process early the next day. The system tracked nearly due east before dissipating on September 16 to the north of the Azores islands.

Hurricane Two 

The Louisiana Hurricane of 1920 

An area of disturbed weather developed into a tropical depression northwest of Colombia on September 16. The system remained a weak tropical depression as it made landfall on Nicaragua, but later intensified to tropical storm strength as it moved across the Gulf of Honduras, prior to making a second landfall on the Yucatán Peninsula. Once in the Gulf of Mexico, the storm quickly intensified as it moved towards the north-northwest, reaching its peak intensity as a Category 2 hurricane with winds of 100 mph (160 km/h) prior to making landfall near Houma, Louisiana with no change in intensity. Afterwards, it quickly weakened over land, before dissipating on September 23 over eastern Kansas.

As it approached the United States Gulf Coast, the hurricane forced an estimated 4,500 people to evacuate off of Galveston Island, and numerous other evacuations and precautionary measures to occur. At landfall, the hurricane generated strong winds along a wide swath of the coast, uprooting trees and causing damage to homes and other infrastructure. The heavy rains also washed out railroads, leading to several rail accidents. Across the Gulf Coast, one death was associated with the hurricane and damage from the storm totaled to $1.45 million (1920 USD).

Hurricane Three 

A low-pressure area developed into a tropical depression on September 19, while located about 245 mi (395 km) southeast of Awendaw, South Carolina. The system, which had an "extremely small diameter", moved in a slow cyclonic loop. Around 1200 UTC on September 20, the depression strengthened into a tropical storm. By midday on September 22, it continued the cyclonic loop while moving northwestward. The storm intensified into a Category 1 hurricane around that time. Maximum sustained winds peaked at 85 mph (140 km/h) late on September 22. However, the hurricane then began to weakened and fell to a strong tropical storm early the following day, at which time it made landfall near Cape Fear, North Carolina. The cyclone quickly weakened after moving inland and dissipated over western Virginia early on September 24.

Inland, a house in Wilmington was blown off its foundation and destroyed in, potentially a small tornado spawned by the cyclone. Many small severe windstorms were reported in Pitt County, where one person was killed, a number of people were injured, and several buildings were demolished.

Tropical Storm Four 

Based on ship observations, the system is estimated to have become a tropical storm early on September 24. The drifted slowly eastward for a few days and peaked with maximum sustained winds of 45 mph (75 km/h) later that day. Eventually, the system curved east-southeastward, but later continued its generally eastward motion at a faster forward speed. Around 1200 UTC on September 27, the storm weakened to a tropical depression, hours before being absorbed by a cold front. This storm was not operationally tracked in real time, but was later added to HURDAT based on weather maps and ship reports.

Hurricane Five 

A low-pressure area centered the Gulf of Mexico on September 25 and was designated as a tropical depression hours later. Turning west-southwestward, the storm gradually intensified, attaining tropical storm-status on September 27. The next day, the system nearly stalled close to the center of the Gulf of Mexico. On September 28, further development of the storm took place and ships in the vicinity of the storm reported a strong gale. The next day, the storm strengthened into a hurricane. Around this time, the storm reached its peak intensity with winds of 85 mph (140 km/h); the storm also began to turn northeastward at this time. The hurricane then accelerated and began weakening. Early on September 30, the storm made landfall near Cedar Key, Florida, with winds up to 65 mph (100 km/h) before transitioning into an extratropical cyclone over Florida. Later that day, the remnants dissipated over the eastern Atlantic Ocean.

Although the storm weakened significantly before landfall, it caused severe damage along the immediate coastlines of western Florida. Low lands along the coast were inundated by storm surge and heavy rains, peaking at 8 in (203.2 mm). Crop lands were flooded, causing substantial damage to the fruit industry. One person was killed after being electrocuted by a downed wire in St. Petersburg. Several ships were also destroyed by the storm while docked along the coast.

Tropical Depression 
On October 20, a westward moving tropical wave developed into a tropical depression about 165 mi (265 km) north-northeast of Barbuda. Trekking northwestward over the next three days, before curving northward in advance of an approaching frontal boundary. By October 25, it began merging with a cold front, finally being absorbed on October 27 about 590 mi (950 km) east-northeast of Bermuda.

Footnotes

See also 

 List of tropical cyclones
 Atlantic hurricane season
 1900–1940 South Pacific cyclone seasons
 1900–1950 South-West Indian Ocean cyclone seasons
 1920s Australian region cyclone seasons

References

External links 

 Monthly Weather Review

 
Articles which contain graphical timelines
1920 meteorology
1920 natural disasters